Oberrieden is a village in the northern part of Hesse, Germany. First recorded mention was in 1150. Since 1971 it belongs to the town of Bad Sooden-Allendorf.

Location
The village of Oberrieden lies in the Werra valley near the Hoher Meißner, right on the boundary with Thuringia, almost at Germany's geographical centre, 33 km east of Kassel. The Bebra-Göttingen railway touches the village in the east.

Neighbouring villages
Oberrieden borders in the east on the community of Lindewerra (Thuringia's Eichsfeld district), in the south on the village of Ellershausen, in the west on the village Hilgershausen and in the north on the villages of Werleshausen and Wendershausen (town of Witzenhausen).

Gallery

External links
 Homepage of Oberrieden 
 Bad Sooden-Allendorf 

Werra-Meißner-Kreis